Victor Petit-Frère Mazuline (21 July 1789 in Fort-Royal, Martinique – 28 January 1854 in Paris) was a French politician from Martinique. He was elected as a people's representative in the first legislative elections held after the abolition of slavery in the colonies, the first black deputy from Martinique.

Life 
Victor Mazuline was born in Fort-Royal (Martinique) on 21 July 1789; his father and mother were both enslaved. He left Martinique in 1802 with his master, Marshal Mottet, chief of the gendarmerie, who took him to the United States aged thirteen, then to France, where Mottet freed him. Mottet died in poverty at the Val-de-Grâce hospital.

Mazuline was later hired as coachman of Pierre Paul Nicolas Henrion de Pansey. When de Pansey's daughter married , a general of the Revolutionary and Napoleonic Wars, Mazuline followed to the new household. He married Anne Claude Chapuis, maid to de Pansey's daughter, who was originally from Haute-Saône. Mazuline and his wife had two daughters, one who died quite young, and another named Madèleine Uranie Victorine. Uranie Mazuline studied well, passing her aptitude exams at the Hôtel de Ville. She founded a girl's boarding school in Martinique.

Political career 
Mazuline eventually left the service of de Pernety, becoming a rentier in Paris. He was an active campaigner, acting as the general treasurer of "" an abolitionist association, and took part in the editiorial committee of Cyrille Bissette's publication, . The French revolution of 1848 removed the ruling monarchy, and during the turmoil affecting the whole French empire, slavery had been abolished in Martinique on 23 May by governor Rostolan. The provisional government of the new regime decreed universal suffrage, banned the death penalty, freedom of assembly, freedom of the press and the abolition of slavery, which came into effect on Martinique on the 9th August, the day elections were to take place. Legislative elections were held throughout 1848 in each of the French colonies. He was elected as the representative of Martinique to the Constituent Assembly, by 18,504 votes out of 20,698 voters, as a substitute for Bissette, whose election was annulled because of a former conviction. Mazuline was therefore elected, being next on the list.

Mazuline's first appearance in the Palais Bourbon, walking the length of the meeting hall of the Deputies to reach his seat as a people's representative, was reported internationally. Victor Mazuline fought to defend the abolition of slavery in the Constitution adopted on 4 November, providing a stability to new freedoms.

He paid tribute to the regime in the following terms:

He voted against the sanction of the Constitution by the people, for the Constitution as a whole and against the proposal of Jean-Pierre Rateau. He obtained a leave of absence and took no part in the subsequent votes. He did not stand in the 1849 elections to set up the National Assembly. After retiring from political life, he died at his townhouse in the 6th arrondissement of Paris, on 28 January 1854.

References 

1789 births
1854 deaths
People from Fort-de-France
Martiniquais politicians
Members of the 1848 Constituent Assembly
French newspaper editors
French abolitionists